Seyyed Morteza Hashemizadeh is an Iranian retired football player. He usually played as a midfielder or forward.

References

External links
 Morteza Hashemizadeh at soccerpunter
 

Iran international footballers
Iranian footballers
Living people
Sepahan S.C. footballers
Esteghlal F.C. players
Steel Azin F.C. players
Payam Mashhad players
Saba players
Iranjavan players
Shahrdari Tabriz players
Aluminium Hormozgan F.C. players
Shahrdari Bandar Abbas players
Siah Jamegan players
Association football midfielders
1979 births